Pratylenchus crenatus is a plant pathogenic nematode infecting potatoes.

References

External links 
 Nemaplex, University of California - Pratylenchus crenatus

crenatus
Plant pathogenic nematodes
Potato diseases
Nematodes described in 1960